Donald Earl Davis Jr. (born December 17, 1972, in Olathe, Kansas) is a former American football player and the current Team Chaplain for the New England Patriots.

High school years
Davis attended Olathe South High School in Olathe, Kansas, and was a student and a letterman in football, basketball, and track & field. In football, as a senior, he was a first-team All-League selection and a second-team All-Metropolitan selection.

College years
Davis was a three-year starter for the University of Kansas, and finished his superb career with 238 tackles (20 tackles for loss) and 9.5 sacks. Don Davis graduated with a degree in Human Development in 1995.

NFL playing career
He was signed as a free agent in 1996 season by the New Orleans Saints. Davis played with the Saints until the middle of the 1998 season when he was traded to the Tampa Bay Buccaneers. He would remain with Tampa Bay through the 2000 season. In 2001 Davis began play for the St. Louis Rams, where he would remain through 2002. Then in 2003 Davis was signed by his final team, the New England Patriots, whom he would stay with for four seasons. He earned two Super Bowl rings with the New England Patriots in 2003 and 2004.

Coaching career
Following the 2006 season, Davis retired and joined the Patriots' strength and conditioning coaches as an assistant coach. He left the organization prior to the 2008 season to pursue Christian ministry. He remained with the Patriots as the team chaplain.

References

External links
New England Patriots profile

1972 births
Living people
Sportspeople from Olathe, Kansas
Players of American football from Kansas
American chaplains
American strength and conditioning coaches
African-American players of American football
American football linebackers
Kansas Jayhawks football players
New Orleans Saints players
Tampa Bay Buccaneers players
St. Louis Rams players
New England Patriots players
New England Patriots coaches
21st-century African-American sportspeople
20th-century African-American sportspeople